Sleeping Princess is a 2010 Turkish comedy-drama film written and directed by Çağan Irmak about a librarian whose quiet life is changed by a new neighbour and her 10-year-old daughter.

Festival screenings 
 16th London Turkish Film Festival (November 4–18, 2010)

See also
 2010 in film
 Turkish films of 2010

References

External links
  for the film (in Turkish)

2010 films
2010 comedy-drama films
Films set in Turkey
Films directed by Çağan Irmak
Turkish comedy-drama films